The Cabot Creamery Cooperative is an American dairy agricultural marketing cooperative, which is owned by more than 800 local dairy farmers in New England and upstate New York, and Agri-Mark Family Dairy Farms, Incorporated. 

Agri-Mark dates back to 1916 with the formation of its predecessor, the New England Milk Producers Association. The cooperative flourished during the twentieth century and in 1980 became Agri-Mark. A dozen years later Agri-Mark merged with Cabot Creamery Cooperative, thereby ensuring that Northeast dairy farmers would continue their ownership of a valuable, time-honored consumer brand -- Cabot. Naturally aged Vermont cheddar cheese and fresh creamery butter top the list of Cabot's best known products. In 2003, Agri-Mark merged with the Chateaugay Cooperative in Upstate New York and acquired the assets of McCadam Cheese, including a plant located in Chateaugay. McCadam manufactures award-winning New York Cheddar, Muenster and European-type cheeses.

History

The original plant had an investment of $3,700 in total, which was paid by 94 farmers in proportion to the number of cattle which each owned.  The cooperative started out making butter with the excess milk produced, and began shipping its products south. In 1930, it started making cheese. By 1960, the cooperative had 600 member farmers, though the number of farms in Vermont and across the nation was steadily shrinking.

Following a decline in membership, the  Cabot Farmers Cooperative Creamery merged in 1992 with Agri-Mark,  a cooperative of 1,800 farm families in New England and New York, and was reincorporated as Cabot Creamery Cooperative Inc., a wholly owned subsidiary of Agri-mark.
In 2008, there were about 400 Cabot farms in Vermont belonging to Agri-Mark.

Cabot has facilities in numerous locations, including Cabot, Vermont, Route 100 in Waterbury, Vermont, and also has an official Cabot "sampling station" at the Quechee General Store located at 5573 Woodstock Road in Quechee, Vermont. Samples of Cabot products are also available at the Waterbury location as well as the Cabot Farmers' Village Store located at 3075 Main Street in Cabot, VT.

In addition to the Cabot brand, Agri-Mark also owns McCadam Cheese, headquartered in Chateaugay, New York. Established in 1876 by William McCadam in the small community of Heuvelton, New York, the company first gained national recognition winning the first medal at the World's Columbian Exposition in Chicago in 1894. In 1934, during the midst of the "Great Depression" McCadam expanded its cheese manufacturing to a facility in Chateaugay, which is its primary cheese manufacturing facility today. McCadam merged with Agri-Mark/Cabot in 2003.

, about 1,200 members were located throughout New England and upstate New York. Faced with a multitude of challenges ranging from low milk pricing, labor shortages and increased operating costs over the past decade, the cooperative lost nearly 400 farms. As of 2021, there are approximately 800 farms in the co-op. The Rochdale Principles remain a part of the cooperative.

Cabot markets its products nationally through regional supermarket chains, big box stores, and online through a relationship with Dakin Farm.

Wine Spectator listed Cabot cloth-bound cheddar as one of "100 great cheeses" of the world in 2008. Also in 2008, Cabot Monterey Jack  received an award from the American Cheese Society.

Ownership
As a co-op, Agri-Mark is a membership organization incorporated in Delaware on April 21, 1980.  The members of the Agri-Mark cooperative, who supply Agri-Mark's equity capital and directly elect its directors, are not stockholders of record, so have no right under Delaware statutory law to inspect the corporation's books and records. Only the directors hold a share of stock, so are owners under Delaware law.

The co-op retains much of the excess profit, up to $150,000 per farmer, as equity in the form of noninterest bearing loans. For farmers departing the co-op, this equity is repaid over seven years. Dividends in excess of the retained equity are returned to the members.

The Delaware stock corporation signs yearly marketing agreements with the farmers who produce milk. They can decline to resign any producer without reason at the end of the contract.

Operations
In 1994, when the two companies merged, they had $30 million in sales. This reached $350 million in 2008. and combined Agri-Mark sales (for all products across all brands) reached nearly $1 billion in 2020.

Legal violations
On several occasions, Cabot has been penalized for pollution incidents by the Vermont Agency of Natural Resources. In 2000, Cabot was cited for a "minor violation of [its] indirect discharge permit and land use permit." In 2007, Cabot paid a $50,000 fine with an additional $50,000 funding of a Supplemental Environmental Projects. In 2007, Cabot also pleaded guilty to violating the Clean Water Act after an ammonia spill killed thousands of fish in the Winooski River, in July 2005.

In 2011, the Vermont Attorney General's office alleged that some Cabot products made in 2009 and 2010 could not be certified as free of rBST, a hormone that causes cows to produce more milk. Cabot settled with the state, agreeing not to make such representations, to pay a $65,000 fine, and to donate $75,000 worth of dairy products to local food banks.

See also
 
 
 List of cheesemakers

References

External links
 
 Cabot Cheese – at the website of the parent co-operative Agri-Mark

1919 establishments in Vermont
Agricultural cooperatives in the United States
Agricultural marketing cooperatives
Agriculture in Vermont
B Lab-certified corporations
Cabot, Vermont
Certified B Corporations in the Food & Beverage Industry
Cheesemakers
Cooperatives based in Vermont
Dairy products companies of the United States
Food and drink companies based in Vermont
Food and drink companies established in 1919